Nayanika (1st century BC) was the queen regent of the Satavahana dynasty during the minority of her son (c. 50–? AD).  

She was the first woman historically confirmed to have ruled over an Indian kingdom (although there are legendary women rulers before her) with the exception of Agathokleia, who ruled in a part of India which later became Pakistan. She was believed to be first women to have her face on Indian coins 

She was married to king Satakarni. She was the mother of king Satakarni II. Her son was a minor when he became king, and she ruled in his place as regent during his minority.

References

 Abraham Eraly, The First Spring: The Golden Age of India

1st-century BC women rulers
1st-century BC Indian people
Ancient Indian women
Satavahana dynasty